OK Jazz, later renamed TPOK Jazz (short for Tout Puissant Orchestre Kinois de Jazz), was a Congolese rumba band from the Democratic Republic of the Congo established in 1956 and fronted by Franco. The group disbanded in 1993, but reformed in 1996.

Location
The OK Jazz band was formed in 1956 in Léopoldville (now Kinshasa), in what was at the time the Belgian Congo (now the Democratic Republic of the Congo). At one time in the late 1970s and early 1980s the band grew to more than fifty members. During that period, it often split into two groups; one group stayed in Kinshasa, playing in nightclubs there, while the other group toured in Africa, Europe and North America.

History

1950–1959
The musicians who started OK Jazz included Vicky Longomba, Jean Serge Essous, François Luambo Makiadi, De La Lune, Augustin Moniania Roitelet, La Monta LiBerlin, Saturnin Pandi, Nicolas Bosuma Bakili Dessoin and vocalist Philippe Lando Rossignol. They used to play at Loningisa Studios in Kinshasa as individual artists, before they got together to form a band in June 1956. The name OK Jazz originated from the bar where they played, which was called the OK Bar, owned by Gaston Cassien (who later changed his name to Oscar Kashama, after Authenticité). The new band played regularly at a specific studio in the city during the week, and on some weekends they played at weddings. In 1957, the lead vocalist, Philippe Lando Rossignol, quit OK Jazz and was replaced by Edo Nganga, from Congo-Brazzaville. Later in the same year, Isaac Musekiwa, a saxophonist from Zimbabwe, joined the band. Up to that time the band's leadership was shared between Vicky Longomba, Essous and Franco.

1960–1969

In the early 1960s Vicky Longomba and Jean Essous left OK Jazz to join African Jazz. Franco then became the leader of the band. He recruited vocalists Kwamy Munsi and Mulamba Joseph Mujos. Simaro Masiya Lutumba joined OK Jazz in 1961. Essous was replaced by saxophonist Verckys Kiamuangana Mateta. In 1962 OK Jazz visited Nigeria on their first foreign tour. Later that year, Vicky Longomba rejoined the band. Lola Checain, a vocalist who had left earlier also came back.

Around this time, the band changed their name to TPOK Jazz. TP stood for "Tout Puissant" (all mighty). Band membership had increased to over twenty. The quality of their music had improved to where they could challenge African Jazz for the position of Congo's premier group. Franco's music had such popular appeal mainly because it discussed issues affecting ordinary people on a daily basis. Franco led other Congolese musicians in using new technology to produce sounds of much higher quality than in any other part of Africa. The new technology included electric guitars, amplifiers and basses. Congo had now assumed the premier position as Africa's leading music nation. During the late 1960s, Kwamy Munsi and Mulamba Joseph Mujos led nine other musicians in a mass defection from TPOK Jazz. A few months later, saxophonist Verckys Kiamuangana Mateta also left. Franco recruited Rondot Kassongo wa Kassongo to replace Verckys. He also brought in solo guitarist Mose Fan Fan. Fan Fan had a new style of guitar-playing called sebene, which was more danceable. This style came to be known as Sebene ya ba Yankees. Fan Fan also composed a number of extremely popular hits, including "Dje Melasi".

1970–1975
During the 1970s Franco and TPOK Jazz consolidated their position as one of the two giants of Congolese popular music, along with Grand Kalle & l'African Jazz.  Many musical stars emerged from both of these bands. TPOK Jazz was staging concerts all over Africa, including places such as Chad and Sudan. The band's finances also improved tremendously.

Franco brought on board the composer/vocalist Sam Mangwana, who has a Zimbabwean father and an Angolan mother, but was born and raised in Kinshasa, DRC. He spoke English, Lingala, French and Portuguese, along with a number of other African languages. His recruitment energised the band and infuriated Afrisa, where he came from. 
 
In early 1970 Vicky Longomba, who was then acting as Co-president of the band left. Mose Fan Fan, the band's flamboyant solo guitarist also left. Then Youlou Mabiala quit and formed Orchestre Somo Somo with Fan Fan. Soon after that Tshongo Bavon Marie Marie, Franco's biological brother died in an automobile accident. The band fell upon hard times with low record sales and as sparsely attended concerts. Franco was grief-stricken and despondent and stopped playing music for some time. Upon his return, he recorded several songs in memory of his late brother.

He then began to rebuild the band. This coincided with the restructuring of Congo by President Mobutu Sese Seko under the program of "L'Authenticite". The name of the country was changed from Congo-Kinshasa to Zaire. Franco adopted the names "L'Okanga La Ndju Pene Luambo Luanzo Makiadi". During this time, vocalist Mayaula Mayoni came on board, along with guitarists Mpundi Decca, Gege Mangaya, Michelino Mavatiku Visi and Thierry Mantuika. Franco then appointed Simaro Lutumba, as the chef d'orchestre. Sam Mangwana composed his hit Luka Mobali Moko around this time.

In 1973 Josky Kiambukuta Londa, a seasoned composer and vocalist, joined the band. In 1974, Youlou Mabiala returned to TPOK Jazz. However, Sam Mangwana left and started a solo career in Cote d'Ivoire. Ndombe Opetum was recruited from Afrisa International to replace Mangwana. He came along with hornsman Empompo Loway. In 1975 Franco released yet another classic hit Bomba Bomba Mabe.

1976–1979
By the mid-1970s Franco was one of Zaire's wealthiest citizens. He invested heavily in real estate in Belgium, France and in Zaire. He owned Kinshasa's four largest and most popular nightclubs, the biggest of which was Un-deux-trois. TPOK Jazz played there every weekend to a packed house. In 1976, vocalist Zitani Dalienst Ya Ntesa and guitarist Gerry Dialungana were convinced to join TPOK Jazz. Mayaula Mayoni composed a song, Cheri Bondowe which was released in an album that also included Alimatou and Bisalela.

In 1977 Franco introduced a handicapped female singer known as Mpongo Love. Despite her handicap which was the result of childhood polio, she went on to become one of the continents most popular singers on the strength of her charming, vivacious voice and her songwriting. Papa Noel Nedule, an accomplished guitarist joined soon after that. Later that year the band represented Zaire in what was Africa's largest ever cultural event, Festac 77 which was staged in Lagos, Nigeria.

In 1978 Franco released two songs — "Helene" and "Jacky" — that were deemed "indecent" by the Attorney General of his native country. After a brief trial, he was convicted and sent to prison, along with other band members, including Simaro Lutumba. Franco was released two months later, following street protests. That same year, Mayaula Mayoni released the song "Nabali Misere" (I am married to misery). He quit the band soon afterwards, to pursue a solo career.

In 1979 Franco moved his recording base from Kinshasa to Brussels, Belgium, to take advantage of superior recording facilities. Franco embarked on a tour of eight West African countries. That same year Josky released Propretaire.

1980–1989
This period marked the pinnacle in the success of the band and that of its leader, Franco Luambo Makiadi. The band was releasing an average of four albums a year during this period. The rival Congolese bands, Afrisa International and Orchestre Veve could not keep up with the competition. Life was good. In 1982 Sam Mangwana returned briefly and released an album with Franco called Cooperation. Franco also released several albums with former nemesis Tabu Ley. In 1983 TPOK Jazz toured the United States of America for the first time. That year the song "Non", featuring Madilu System and Franco in alternating lead vocals, was released.

In the mid-1980s the band continued to churn out best sellers including Makambo Ezali Borreaux, 12,600 Letters to Franco, Pesa Position, Mario and Boma Ngai na Boma Yo. By this time, Madilu System had taken over as the lead vocalist. In 1986, Josky Kiambukuta and Zitani Dalienst Ya Ntesa, two vocalists who felt they were not getting enough prime time exposure led another mass exodus to form their own band. Around this time, Simaro Lutumba released an album outside the OK Jazz system, featuring the song "Maya". During the same timeframe, Malage de Lugendo, a vocalist, was recruited. Also Kiesse Diambu ya Ntessa from Afrisa and female vocalist Joliet Detta came on board.

At the beginning of 1987, Franco released a 15-minute song with the title "Attention Na Sida" (Beware of AIDS). Sung mainly in French amid heavy African drums and a kaleidoscope of thundering guitars, the song is moving even if one does not understand all the words. Also in 1987, TPOK Jazz were invited to perform at the 4th All-Africa Games in Nairobi, Kenya. On one of the eight albums that the band released in 1987, called Les On Dit, Franco introduced two new female vocalists Nana Akumu and Baniel Bambo. In 1988, Josky and Dalienst re-joined the band.

1989 was a challenging year for the band. Franco's health was in obvious decline. He had by now moved permanently to Brussels. He did not play much and when he did, could only manage about twenty minutes. The band started to fall apart with the defection of Malage de Lugendo and Dizzy and Decca, who returned to Kinshasa to pursue other opportunities. Later that year Sam Mangwana teamed with Franco to release the album Forever. The album sleeve carried a photograph of Franco in which he appeared emancipated and obviously in ill-health. It turned out to be Franco's last album.

On 12 October 1989, Francois Luambo Makiadi died in a hospital in Brussels, Belgium. His body was flown back to Zaire. After four days of mourning, he was given a state funeral on 17 October 1989, by Mobutu Sese Seko's government.

1990–1993
Following the death of Franco, the band members, led by Simaro Lutumba, Josky Kiambukuta, Ndombe Opetum and Madilu System approached the Franco family and agreed to split earnings; (70% musicians and 30% family). This arrangement worked from August 1989 until December 1993.

During that period, the band released an album entitled Hommage A Luambo Makiadi, made up of songs recorded before Franco died. Josky released an album featuring the song "Chandra". Simarro released an album that featured the hit "Eau Benite", sung by Madilu, and another album Somo, which included the songs "Marby", composed by Josky, and "Mort Viviant Somida", composed by Madilu System. The band continued to tour both in Africa and in Europe. More defections beset the band but the majority of the musicians hung in there.

Then in December 1993 it all came crashing down. The Franco family was not satisfied with the profit-sharing arrangement in place at the time. The family wanted more money. They could not reach an agreement with the musicians. The musicians returned the musical equipment to the family and went on to form a new band, Bana OK. Thus ended the life of one of Africa's most famous bands of the twentieth century, that lasted more than thirty-seven years; from June 1956 until December 1993.

Band members

TPOK Jazz had many members over the nearly 38 years of its existence. The list of band members reads like a "Congolese Music Hall of Fame Inductees". Many members came and went, with many of those who left coming back, some on more than one occasion. Here are some of the members of the band.

Discography
A small fraction of the hundreds of records and albums released by TPOK Jazz during the thirty-seven and a half years of the band's existence includes:

See also 

African Rumba
Music of the Democratic Republic of the Congo
Francois Luambo Makiadi
List of African musicians

References

Further reading

External links
Overview of TPOK Jazz – Written In 2012
François Luambo Makiadi, The James Brown of Africa
Jesse Samba Wheeler, "Rumba Lingala As Colonial Resistance", Image & Narrative, March 2005.
"Congo music", AfroPop Worldwide.
Banning, Eyre, Interview With Simaro Lutumba, Kinshasa, Congo, 2002.
"Télé Zaïre 1975 Franco & le T.P. O.K. Jazz" 
 
 

1956 establishments in the Belgian Congo
1993 disestablishments in Zaire
Democratic Republic of the Congo musical groups
Soukous groups
Musical groups established in 1956
Musical groups disestablished in 1993
Culture of Kinshasa